The 18th Army Corps was an Army corps in the Imperial Russian Army. Its headquarters was located at Saint Petersburg.

Composition
23rd Infantry Division
37th Infantry Division
50th Infantry Division

Part of
9th Army: 1914–1915
11th Army: 1915–1916
7th Army: 1916
8th Army: 1916–1917
9th Army: 1917

Commanders
Ivan Makarovich Orbeliani: 1905-1906
Platon Lechitsky: 1908-1910
Andrei Zayonchkovski: 1916–1917
Ivan Erdieli: 1917

Corps of the Russian Empire